Goldsbirgh Arthur Monroe Cephus (October 16, 1898 – December 9, 1983) was an American Negro league outfielder in the 1920s and 1930s.

A native of Preston, Maryland, Cephus made his Negro leagues debut in 1928 with the Cleveland Tigers and Memphis Red Sox. He went on to play for the Bacharach Giants in 1931 and the Newark Dodgers in 1934. Cephus died in Philadelphia, Pennsylvania in 1983 at age 85.

References

External links
 and Baseball-Reference Black Baseball stats and Seamheads

1898 births
1983 deaths
Bacharach Giants players
Cleveland Tigers (baseball) players
Memphis Red Sox players
Newark Dodgers players
Baseball outfielders
Baseball players from Maryland
People from Caroline County, Maryland
20th-century African-American sportspeople